"Will" is Mika Nakashima's 5th single. The single was released on August 7, 2002, and sold 144,771 copies, reaching #3 on Oricon.

'Will,' an easy listening ballad, was the theme song for the Japanese drama 'Tentai Kansoku' (Searchin' for My Polestar) in 2002.

Chart history

Track listing
Will
Just Trust in Our Love
Will (Instrumental)
Just Trust in Our Love (Instrumental)

2002 singles
Mika Nakashima songs
Songs with lyrics by Yasushi Akimoto
Japanese television drama theme songs
2002 songs